The women's javelin throw events were held at the 2021 World Para Athletics European Championships in Bydgoszcz, Poland.

Medalists

See also
List of IPC world records in athletics

References

Javelin throw
2021 in women's athletics
Javelin throw at the World Para Athletics European Championships